Sun Marathi is Marathi language free-to-air general entertainment channel owned by Sun TV Network. This channel was launched on 16 October 2021. Sun Marathi is Sun's one more new TV channel apart from Southern India, 2nd entry into north India after Sun Bangla. Its slogan is "Sohala Natyancha" (मराठी: सोहळा नात्यांचा) which means "Celebration of Relationships".

Current broadcast

Drama series

Dubbed show

Former broadcast

Drama series

Dubbed shows

References

External links
Sun Marathi Official site

Television stations in Mumbai
Marathi-language television channels
Sun Group
Television channels and stations established in 2021
Mass media in Mumbai
Mass media in Maharashtra
2021 establishments in Maharashtra